Parque Tangamanga I and II are public parks in the city of San Luis Potosí.

History

Parque Tangamanga I was inaugurated in 1983 in the former Hacienda La Tenería. The Parque Tangamanga II was the old airport of the city, and turned into a park in 1985.

Parque Tangamanga I

After Bosque de Chapultepec is the second largest urban park in Mexico. The park has 411 ha of area. The park is located in the south of city.

Facilities
 Ecomuseo and Restaurant (In the former "casco" —main house— of the "La Tenería Hacienda")
 Sporting facilities (Soccer, Baseball, SoftBall, Football, Basketball, Tennis, Motocross, Bicicross, Archery, Scale planes aerodrome, Gym, Jogging)
 Carlos Amador Movie-Theatre
 "Splash" Watering PLace
 Planetarium (Clausurado)
 Teatro de la Ciudad (City Theatre)
 "El Laberinto" Interactive Museum

Parque Tangamanga II

Parque Tangamanga II is located in the north of the city.

Facilities

Canal 9

Since 2002 the local channel 9 is in the park.

Autódromo San Luis 400

The Autódromo is a permanent circuit. The raceway is located in the old airport runway. The track was venue for many national categories like Desafío Corona, Copa Pirelli, LATAM Challenge Series, Super Copa Telcel, CARreras.

References

 Guía de la Ciudad de San Luis Potosí –Rafael Montejano y Aguiñaga
 Breve Historia de la Ciudad de San Luis Potosí –Arnoldo Kaiser Schlittler

Motorsport venues in Mexico
NASCAR tracks
Parks in Mexico
Geography of San Luis Potosí
Tourist attractions in San Luis Potosí